1/9 may refer to:

 1/9 (number), a fraction (one ninth)
1st Battalion, 9th Marines, an infantry battalion of the United States Marine Corps
January 9 or September 1, depending on date format
Breaker 1/9, a song by Common
Former 1 (New York City Subway service) and 9 (New York City Subway service), which shared the same route
U.S. Route 1/9, in New Jersey

See also
9/1 (disambiguation)
1-9 (disambiguation)